Edward Brook (31 May 1895 – 5 November 1954) was a New Zealand cricket umpire. He stood in one Test match, New Zealand vs. England, in 1954.

See also
 List of Test cricket umpires
 English cricket team in New Zealand in 1950–51

References

1895 births
1954 deaths
Sportspeople from Christchurch
New Zealand Test cricket umpires